Adultery (간통 Gantong) is a 1989 South Korean erotic drama film.

Plot
Na young is raped on vacation while her husband Myung ho is on a business trip. Sanghyun raped Na young in a spirit of vengeance for his old girl that resembles Na young, yet Na young soon becomes obsessed and begins having an affair with her rapist Sang hyun. Meanwhile, Myung ho has an affair with his daughter's piano teacher and she becomes pregnant. Na young learns about this affair and tries to divorce Myung ho out of guilt, but after Myung ho apologized and her daughter Chorong appealed to her in tears, the two reconcile.

Cast
From movie ending credits:
Bang Hee:Na young
Lee Moo-jung:Young ho 
Jeong In-cheol:Sang hyun
Sim Eun-yeong:Jiyeon
Kwak Jung-hee:Hyesook
Gwon Yeong-jin:Hyunjoo
Jeon Shook:Mother
Choe Sung-kwan:Father
Park Mi-na:Prostitute
Jang Ae-hui:Noble woman 1
Kim min kyung:Noble woman 2
Lee joo ran:Noble woman  3
Kim un ok:Housemaid

References

External links
 

1989 films
1980s Korean-language films
South Korean erotic drama films
Adultery in films
1980s erotic drama films
1989 crime drama films